The All-Union Communist Party of Bolsheviks (VKPB; ; Vsesoyuznaya kommunisticheskaya partiya bolshevikov, VKPB) is an anti-revisionist Marxist–Leninist communist party operating in Russia and other former Soviet states. It was founded in November 1991 and led by Nina Andreyeva, a university teacher who was well known for her 1988 letter "I cannot give up my principles".

History
The AUCPB has its origins in the "Bolshevik Platform" of the Communist Party of the Soviet Union. The party is known for its sectarian positions, e.g. it opposes the Communist Party of the Russian Federation due to its "reformist" character and has refused to back its candidates for presidential election. It is also an outspoken critic of the Russian church and religion in general demanding the separation of church and state. It is also a critic of Vladimir Putin's regime.

Its youth section is the All-Union Young Guard Bolsheviks.

References

External links
 Official website

1991 establishments in the Soviet Union
Anti-revisionist organizations
Neo-Stalinist parties
Communist parties in Russia
Communist parties in the Soviet Union
Far-left political parties
Far-left politics in Russia
Opposition to Vladimir Putin
Political parties established in 1991
Transnational political parties
Political organizations based in Russia